Manganese(III) fluoride (also known as Manganese trifluoride) is the inorganic compound with the formula MnF3.  This red/purplish solid is useful for converting hydrocarbons into fluorocarbons, i.e., it is a fluorination agent.  It forms a hydrate and many derivatives.

Synthesis, structure and reactions
MnF3 can be prepared by treating a solution of MnF2 in hydrogen fluoride with fluorine:
MnF2  +  0.5 F2  →  MnF3

It can also be prepared by the reaction of elemental fluorine with a manganese(II) halide at ~250 °C.

Structure
Like vanadium(III) fluoride, MnF3 features octahedral metal centers with the same average M-F bond distances.  In the Mn compound, however, is distorted (and hence a monoclinic unit cell vs. a higher symmetry one) due to the Jahn-Teller effect, with pairs of Mn-F distances of 1.79, 1.91, 2.09 Å.

The hydrate MnF3.3H2O is obtained by crystallisation of MnF3 from hydrofluoric acid.  The hydrate exists as two polymorphs, with space groups P21/c and P21/a.  Each consists of the salt [Mn(H2O)4F2]+[Mn(H2O)2F4]− ).

Reactions
MnF3 is Lewis acidic and forms a variety of derivatives.  One example is K2MnF3(SO4). MnF3 reacts with sodium fluoride to give the octahedral hexafluoride:
3NaF + MnF3 → Na3MnF6
Related reactions salts of the anions MnF52− or MnF4−. These anions adopt chain and layer structures respectively, with bridging fluoride.  Manganese remains 6 coordinate, octahedral, and trivalent in all of these materials.

Manganese(III) fluoride fluorinates organic compounds including aromatic hydrocarbons, cyclobutenes, and fullerenes.

On heating, MnF3 decomposes to manganese(II) fluoride.

MnF3 is a source of MnCl3 complexes by reaction with bismuth trichloride.

See also
CoF3, another fluorinating agent based on a transition metal in an oxidising +3 state.

References

Further reading
Novel syntheses of some binary fluorides: the role of anhydrous hydrogen fluoride Acta Chim. Slov. 1999, 46(2), pp. 229–238, Zoran Mazej, Karel Lutar and Boris Žemva
Knudsen Cell mass spectrometry study of Manganese Trifluoride vaporisation, High temperature corrosion and materials chemistry IV: proceedings of the International Symposium, pp. 521–525,  google books

External links
National Pollutant Inventory: Fluoride and compounds fact sheet
National Pollutant Inventory: Manganese and compounds Fact Sheet

Fluorides
Manganese(III) compounds
Metal halides
Fluorinating agents